The Department of Defense Dependents Schools (DoDDS) are a network of schools, both primary and secondary, that serve the dependents of United States military and civilian United States Department of Defense (DoD) personnel in three areas of the world; Europe, Pacific, and Eastern United States and Caribbean areas. United States Contractor personnel supporting the Department of Defense overseas are eligible to send their dependents for a fee. The schools themselves are operated by the Department of Defense Education Activity (DoDEA). This school system is the tenth-largest American school system.



History 
DoDDS started operating schools October 14, 1946, for the children of military overseas. The intent was to ensure an American educational experience for the American student. Therefore the children, teachers, and educational program were and are American. It then cost $10 to enroll a child ($ in  dollars). The schools would get operational funds from profits made by Class VI stores (alcohol). It now can cost as much as $20,000 for enrollment for non-Command Sponsored military families, or Command Sponsored Contractors, and increases approximately $800 annually.

In 1946, the Department of Defense Dependent Schools was created for dependents of military members of the armed forces in overseas areas. After World War II, the increased demand for American education overseas was a result of the government's decision to allow soldiers to bring their families when deployed. By 1949, almost 100 schools were being operated separately by the Army, Navy, and Air Force in countries around the world.

In 2011 there were 120 schools. With the closing of Heidelberg High School in 2012, all of the original high schools opened in post World War II Europe are now closed, although many other DoDDS high schools have opened since then. The original six were Berlin, Bremen, Frankfurt, Heidelberg, Munich and Nurnberg. All six American High Schools opened in Germany in September/October 1946.   DoDDS also operatates Kubasaki High School on Okinawa, Japan, Nile C. Kinnick High School in Yokosuka, Japan (formerly Yokohama High School), and W.T. Sampson High School in Cuba.

Although operating outside the U.S., the DoDDS system is the tenth largest of American school systems.

Operations 
All schools in the DoDDS system operate outside of the states of the United States and the District of Columbia. There are also some schools that operate on military installations within the United States, but those are grouped in a separate organization within DoDEA, the Department of Defense Domestic Dependent Elementary and Secondary Schools (DDESS). DoDDS has superintendents for two districts: Europe and Pacific. The DoDDS Pacific schools are, for the most part, in the Far East on installations in South Korea and Japan. Schools on military bases in Guam are under DDESS jurisdiction, but are administered by DoDDS Pacific (presumably for administrative convenience). Turkish DoDDS schools are served by the European branch. Schools on the Guantanamo Bay Naval Base in Cuba fall under the jurisdiction of DoDDS, but are administered by DDESS. Schools on bases in Puerto Rico are under DDESS.

Although the schools are primarily for dependents of military personnel, U.S. government employees are allowed to enroll their children in the schools on a space-available basis. As all of these schools are situated overseas, a concerted effort is made to immerse the children in the local culture. Language and culture courses are offered as early as elementary school, while advanced language courses and opportunities to intimately view the culture of the student's host nation are offered throughout high school.

DoDDS schools operate with two structures in terms of grade levels:
The old American standard, in which elementary schools run from kindergarten to sixth grade while high school serves seventh through twelfth graders.
A newer standard, adopted by some DoDDS facilities in the 1970s, in which kindergarten to 3rd-5th grade students attend elementary school, post-elementary students up to 8th grade attend middle school, and 9th through 12th graders attend high school.

As a result of IDEA 2004, students with special education disabilities attend schools within DoDDS. These students are in pre-K (preschool or early childhood) through high school. The infants-toddlers special education program exists overseas on U.S. military bases, though not coordinated through DoDDS. School psychologists are directly employed by DoDDS and civilian employed clinical child psychologists are employed by the U.S. military to provide direct and indirect services to students with special needs. Not all levels of special education services are available at all schools and base locations.

DoDDS range from kindergarten to 12th grade, and some universities are accredited by the Department of Defense.

In addition to operating retail facilities on overseas military installations, the Army & Air Force Exchange Service provides four million school lunches each year in overseas Department of Defense schools at a break-even expense to support military families.

Environmental changes

While there are typical environmental changes that may affect any child's educational performance such as divorce, and relocation, there are some that are systemic with military children. Relocation is frequent and parents may be deployed from home.

A study was done focusing on parental absences during the time of the military deployments to Iraq and Afghanistan between 2002 and 2005. The study reports the adverse effects of deployment especially with long deployments or deployments that occur during the month of academic testing. Effects can continue and can be detrimental for children's academic achievements.

Districts 
For the European branch of DoDDS, there are three districts:
Europe East – headquartered at Kaiserslautern – 35 schools across Germany
Europe West – headquartered at Brussels – 20 schools in the United Kingdom, Belgium, Germany and the Netherlands
Europe South – headquartered at Vicenza – 21 schools in Bahrain, Italy, Spain, and Turkey

The Pacific branch, officially DoDDS-Pacific/DDESS-Guam, has three DoDDS districts and one DDESS district:
Pacific West District – headquartered in Seoul – 10 schools
Pacific East District – headquartered at Yokota Air Base in the Japan – 21 schools
Pacific South District – headquartered at Kadena Air Base in the Japan – 17 schools

Schools

Miscellaneous 
The Kaiserslautern District has the most DoDDS schools worldwide, and serves over 5,000 students.

Beginning with the 2007–08 school year, Kaiserslautern High School merged with a neighboring elementary school. Students from Landstuhl Middle School and other students living in select areas were redistricted to Kaiserslautern starting with the 2008–09 school year. Current elementary students will attend Vogelweh Elementary. Therefore, KHS's student population will increase from 650 students to about 900.

For every sports season, the schools compete in the DoDDS Championship, held at various locations.

See also

Military brat (U.S. subculture)
Bavaria District (DoDDS-Europe)
Department of Defense Education Activity
List of schools in United States territories

External links
DoDEA official website
DoDEA Europe website
DoDEA Pacific website
Europe West District (Formerly Isles DSO)
Europe East District (Formerly Kaiserslautern DSO)
Europe South District (Formerly Vicenza DSO)
American Overseas Historical Society website

Notes

Department of Defense Education Activity
Installations of the U.S. Department of Defense